Bill Jaques also known as Jacques (8 December 1888 – 6 June 1925) was a professional footballer who played for Northfleet United (where he won the Kent Senior Cup in 1910), Coventry City and Tottenham Hotspur.

Football career 
Jaques signed for Tottenham from Coventry in 1914. The reliable goal keeper played a total of 138 matches in all competitions for the club between 1914 and 1922. He was a regular in the Second Division championship winning side of 1919–20.

Honours 
Tottenham Hotspur
Football League Second Division: 1919–20

References 

1888 births
1925 deaths
Footballers from Erith
English footballers
Association football goalkeepers
English Football League players
Coventry City F.C. players
Tottenham Hotspur F.C. players
Northfleet United F.C. players